Rocktronic is the second solo album by video game music composer Frank Klepacki, released in 2004 and featuring ten songs.



Track listing
 Decible
 Rocktronic
 Escape
 In Yo Face
 Take me
 It Has Begun
 The Streets
 In The Tunnel
 Machines Collide
 Bring the Fight

All tracks were written and performed by Frank Klepacki.

References 

2004 albums
Frank Klepacki albums